Sugartown is an unincorporated settlement in central Willistown Township, Chester County, Pennsylvania, United States, at the intersection of Sugartown and Boot Roads. It is located 18 miles west of Philadelphia.

The town was named after Eli Shugart, a 19th-century tavern keeper. Sugartown is a typical crossroads village that provides goods and services to the surrounding farm community. It played an important part in the development of Willistown and contains an inn, general store, blacksmith and wheelwright, cabinetmaker, saddler, shoemaker and a doctor.

The Sugartown Historic District is a national historic district that encompasses 14 contributing buildings.  It includes the Sign of the Spread Eagle tavern (c. 1790), Sugartown Store (c. 1800) and residence (1860), Willistown Township Building (1909), "Coxefield" (c. 1790), Shoemaker's shop (c. 1790), Sugartown School (1866), the Friends school (1782-1783, 1862), and schoolmaster's house (1785).

References

External links
 Historic Sugartown

Historic districts on the National Register of Historic Places in Pennsylvania
Buildings and structures in Chester County, Pennsylvania
Unincorporated communities in Chester County, Pennsylvania
Unincorporated communities in Pennsylvania
National Register of Historic Places in Chester County, Pennsylvania